Thomas Eugene Beier (born June 23, 1945) is a former American football safety at the University of Miami (Florida) and professionally for the Miami Dolphins of the American Football League. He is a graduate of Saint Joseph Central Catholic High School in Fremont, Ohio.

See also
 Other American Football League players

1945 births
Living people
All-American college football players
American football safeties
Miami Dolphins players
Miami Hurricanes football players
People from Fremont, Ohio
Players of American football from Ohio
American Football League players